Neu! is the debut album by German krautrock band Neu!. It was released in 1972 by Brain Records. It was the first album recorded by the duo of Michael Rother and Klaus Dinger after leaving Kraftwerk in 1971. They continued to work with producer Konrad "Conny" Plank, who had also worked on the Kraftwerk recording sessions.

Upon release, the album was largely ignored internationally but did well in West Germany, selling 35,000 copies. In 2001, the album was reissued by Grönland and then licensed to Astralwerks for US distribution. In 2014, Fact named it the 36th best album of the 1970s.

History 
Having broken off from an early incarnation of Kraftwerk, Michael Rother and Klaus Dinger quickly began the recording sessions for what would become  Neu!. The pair recorded the album in four nights in December 1971  in Star Studios in Hamburg, with the up-and-coming Krautrock producer Conny Plank, as Dinger had with Kraftwerk. Dinger noted that Plank served as a "mediator" between the often disagreeing factions within the band.

According to Dinger, the first two days were unproductive until he brought his taishōgoto ("Japanese banjo") to the sessions, a heavily treated version of which can be heard on "Negativland", the first of the album's six tracks to be recorded. It was during these sessions that Dinger first played his famous "motorik" beat. Two songs on the album, "Hallogallo" and "Negativland", feature this beat. Motorik is a repeated  drumbeat with only occasional interruptions, perhaps best showcased on "Hallogallo". Dinger claimed never to have used the term "motorik" himself, preferring either "lange gerade" ("long straight") or "endlose gerade" ("endless straight"). He later changed the beat's "name" to the "Apache beat" to coincide with his 1985 solo album Neondian.

The band was christened by Dinger (Rother had been against the name, preferring a more "organic" title) and a pop-art style logo was created, featuring italic capitals. Dinger recalled Neu!'s logo:

Reception 
Neu! sold well for an underground album at the time, with approximately 35,000 copies sold.

In 2001, Q described the album's motorik beat as "krautrock's defining relentless rhythm" and an influence on ambient music and punk. In 2008, Ben Sisario of The New York Times described the album and its successors as "landmarks of German experimental rock."

The track "Negativland" provided the name for a later group of American musical satirists.

Track listing

Personnel 
Neu!
 Michael Rother – guitar, bass guitar, bowed bass
 Klaus Dinger – drums, guitar, Japanese banjo, vocals
Additional personnel
 Konrad "Conny" Plank – producer, engineer

References

External links
 

1972 debut albums
Neu! albums
Brain Records albums
Albums produced by Conny Plank